Nepal Physical Society (NPS) is a professional society of the Nepalese physicists. The small society of about 500 members was established in 1982.

Membership
To be eligible for membership, one has to hold a minimum of a master's degree in physical science from either Tribhuvan University or another university that is recognized by Tribhuvan University. The NPS offers two kinds of memberships in general: Ordinary Membership and Life Membership. Ordinary Membership is to be renewed every year by paying a nominal membership fee. Life membership can be obtained by paying the fee designated for life membership. An executive body is formed by general convention in every two years.

Nepal Physical Society signed the agreement to be a reciprocal society with the American Physical Society (APS) on September 21, 1995. This society is also a member of Association of Asia Pacific Physical societies (AAPPs).

Activities
The society organizes different scientific and educational activities related to physical sciences in Nepal. These activities include lectures and classes on topics in physics like Group Theory. These lectures are intended for people who want to broaden their knowledge in the field of physics. The society publishes Nepal Physical Society News letters on a regular basis. Previously, the office of the society was situated in Tri-Chandra College, Ghantaghar, Kathmandu, Nepal. Currently, the office is in the Central Department of Physics, Tribhuvan University, Kirtipur, Nepal. Nepal Physical Society participated in the 38th International Physics Olympiad in 2007.

See also
 Nepal Mathematical Society

References

External links
 
 list of reciprocal member societies
 http://www.aapps.org/societies.html
 http://www.physnet.de/PhysNet/societies.html#Asia

Professional associations based in Nepal
Physics societies
1982 establishments in Nepal
Scientific organizations established in 1982
Science and technology in Nepal